Zita Loseva (born 17 June 1954 in Maironiai, Kelmė District Municipality) is a Lithuanian politician and public activist.

Biography
In 1992 she graduated from Vilnius University, she has hold a master's degree in finance and economics. Since 2011 she is a member of Kelmė District Council.

She is a chief of Šiauliai region State Internal Revenue Service department of Kelmė.

Member of Lithuanian Socialdemocratic Party's department of Kelmė County. Since 2011 she's a member of Kelmė County Council.

During cadency of 2011–2015 at Kelmė County Council she was a member of Council Budget and Investment Commity During elections of 2015, she was one more time elected to be a member of Kelmė County Council.

References 

1954 births
Living people
Lithuanian politicians
Vilnius University alumni
People from Kelmė